James Edward McDonald (May 7, 1920 – June 13, 1971) was an American physicist. He is best known for his research regarding UFOs. McDonald was a senior physicist at the Institute for Atmospheric Physics and a professor of meteorology at the University of Arizona in Tucson.

During the 1960s McDonald campaigned in support of expanding UFO studies, and promoted the extraterrestrial hypothesis as a plausible explanation of UFO phenomena.

Early life and career 
McDonald was born and raised in Duluth, Minnesota. He served as a cryptographer in the United States Navy during World War II, and afterwards, married Betsy Hunt. McDonald received a B.A. in chemistry from the University of Omaha in 1942 and an M.S. in meteorology from the Massachusetts Institute of Technology in 1945 before completing his Ph.D. in physics at Iowa State University in 1951. He taught at the University of Chicago for a year, then in 1953, helped establish a meteorology and atmospherics program at the University of Arizona as a professor of meteorology. McDonald eventually became the head of the Institute of Atmospheric Physics.

UFO studies 

McDonald's first detailed, public discussion of UFOs was in a lecture given before an American Meteorological Society assembly in Washington D.C. on October 5, 1966. Entitled "The Problem of UFOs", McDonald said that scientific scrutiny should be directed towards the small number of "unknowns", which he defined as a UFO reported by a "credible and trained observer as machine-like 'craft' which remained unidentified in spite of careful investigation." He noted that the vast majority of UFOs could become Identified flying objects, and, in his estimation, only about 1% of UFOs were true "unknowns".

In 1967 the Office of Naval Research supported McDonald to conduct his own UFO research, ostensibly to study the idea that some UFOs were misidentified clouds. He was able to examine the files of Project Blue Book at Wright Patterson Air Force Base, and eventually concluded that the Air Force was mishandling UFO evidence. McDonald secured support from United Nations Secretary General U Thant, who arranged for McDonald to speak to the UN's Outer Space Affairs Group on June 7, 1967. Additionally in 1967, McDonald noted, "There is no sensible alternative to the utterly shocking hypothesis that UFOs are extraterrestrial probes".

In his Statement on Unidentified Objects to the House Committee on Science and Astronautics, McDonald made the following remarks regarding types of UFO accounts.

"the scientific world at large is in for a shock when it becomes aware of the astonishing nature of the UFO phenomenon and its bewildering complexity. I make that terse comment well aware that it invites easy ridicule; but intellectual honesty demands that I make clear that my two years' study convinces me that in the UFO problem lie scientific and technological questions that will challenge the ability of the world's outstanding scientists to explain - as soon as they start examining the facts. [...] the scientific community [...] has been casually ignoring as nonsense a matter of extraordinary scientific importance."

The Condon Committee 
Following a widely publicized series of mass UFO sightings in southern Michigan, the federal government created the Condon Committee in late 1966, named after committee chairman Edward Condon, a former director of the National Bureau of Standards. McDonald offered to serve on the committee, but when he was denied a position, McDonald still agreed to assist with the committee's work.

When the Condon Committee issued its final report in 1969, Condon wrote in the foreword to the report that, based on the committee's investigations, his conclusion was that there was nothing unusual about UFO reports; thus further scientific research into the UFO phenomenon was not worthwhile and should be discouraged. Condon's conclusions about UFOs were generally accepted by most scientists and the mainstream news media. McDonald, however, wrote detailed critiques and rebuttals of Condon's conclusions regarding UFOs. McDonald was particularly disturbed by the fact that, while Condon in his foreword claimed that all UFO reports could be explained as hoaxes or misidentifications of man-made or natural objects or phenomena, the Report itself marked over 30% of the cases it investigated as "unexplained".

1968: Congressional UFO testimony 
McDonald spoke before the United States Congress for a UFO hearing in 1968. In part, he stated his opinion that "UFOs are entirely real and we do not know what they are, because we have laughed them out of court. The possibility that these are extraterrestrial devices, that we are dealing with surveillance from some advanced technology, is a possibility I take very seriously".

1969: "Science in Default" 
In 1969, McDonald was a speaker at an American Association for the Advancement of Science UFO symposium. There he delivered a lecture, "Science in Default", in which he discussed a handful of UFO cases which seemed, he thought, to defy interpretation by conventional science. Ufologist Jerome Clark called the lecture "one of the most powerful scientific defenses of UFO reality ever mounted".

Later life and death 
In 1970 McDonald appeared before a committee of the United States Congress to provide evidence against the development of the supersonic transport (SST) plane, where he testified that the plane could potentially harm the Earth's ozone layer. During that testimony Congressman Silvio O. Conte of Massachusetts — whose district contained factories that would help build the SST — tried to discredit McDonald by referring to his UFO research. Although McDonald defended his UFO work and noted that his evidence regarding the SST had nothing to do with UFOs, Conte stated that anyone who "believes in little green men" was, in his opinion, not a credible witness.

On June 13, 1971, McDonald was found dead with a head wound in a desert area, with a .38 caliber revolver and apparent suicide note found nearby.

Sources

External links 
 Statement on UFOs by James McDonald to the House Committee on Science and Astronautics, 1968 (PDF)
 An actual Project Blue Book Report from Dr. McDonald
 Publications of Dr. James McDonald
 Historical Documents from the Phillip Klass collection of Robert Sheaffer concerning McDonald and Klass

1920 births
1971 suicides
University of Nebraska Omaha alumni
Massachusetts Institute of Technology School of Science alumni
Iowa State University alumni
University of Chicago faculty
University of Arizona faculty
People from Duluth, Minnesota
20th-century American physicists
Suicides by firearm in Arizona
Ufologists
1971 deaths